Kenneth R. Sembach is an American astronomer and, from October of 2015 to August of 2022, was the Director of the Space Telescope Science Institute in Baltimore, Maryland.

Awards
2001 Newton Lacy Pierce Prize in Astronomy

References

External links
"Kenneth R. Sembach", Scientific Commons
"Kenneth R. Sembach", Google scholar

American astronomers
Living people
Year of birth missing (living people)